Lion Attacking a Dromedary is an orientalist diorama by French taxidermist Édouard Verreaux in the collection of the Carnegie Museum of Natural History. It depicts a fictional scene of a man on a dromedary struggling to fend off an attack by a Barbary lion.

The diorama was created for the Paris Exposition of 1867 and subsequently shown at the American Museum of Natural History, Centennial Exposition, and the Carnegie Museum of Natural History. Lion Attacking a Dromedary was purchased by the Carnegie Museum of Natural History in 1898 and has been in the museum's collection ever since. As part of a 2017 restoration, the museum found human remains in the diorama. In 2020, the diorama was removed from view in response to the Black Lives Matter movement and the lack of accuracy. Starting later that year and continuing into 2021, Lion Attacking a Dromedary was returned to public view with additional context.

Since the 1890s, Lion Attacking a Dromedary has been criticized for its sensationalism and lack of accuracy. The male figure, referred to as an Arab by Verreaux, is a fictional pastiche of five North African cultures. Despite the criticism, the diorama is considered to be Verreaux's masterpiece.

Creation and early exhibitions
Lion Attacking a Dromedary was created by French taxidermist Édouard Verreaux. Édouard was part of Maison Verreaux, a French taxidermy studio, with his brother Jules Verreaux. Verreaux created the work with the remains of a human, two barbary lions, and dromedary that were collected in Africa. The location from which the skins and bones were sourced and the date on which they were collected are unknown. The positioning of the human and lions in the diorama was based on Arab Horseman Killing a Boar and The Tiger Hunt by French sculptor Antoine-Louis Barye.

Lion Attacking a Dromedary was first displayed at the Paris Exposition of 1867 where it won a gold medal. After the death of Verreaux in 1867, Lion Attacking a Dromedary was sold to the American Museum of Natural History and shown at the 1876 Centennial Exposition.

Exhibition in Pittsburgh
In 1898, Lion Attacking a Dromedary was sold to the Carnegie Museum of Natural History for $50 and cost $45 to be shipped to Pittsburgh due to the diorama's size. The work was considered to be "too theatrical" to be displayed at the American Museum of Natural History. The next year, Frederick Webster restored the diorama. During Webster's restoration, the museum made several changes. Due to a crack in the camel's neck, the position of the male figure was changed to be off of the saddle as is seen today. The museum purchased an Arabian flintlock long gun from an antiques dealer in Pittsburgh and added it to the piece at this time.

After the restoration, the piece went on display. From 1899 until 2016, Lion Attacking a Dromedary was shown at the Carnegie Museum of Natural History in five different locations around the museum. Early labels for the piece showed the dramatic stories that could be written about it instead of the educational value. In the 1980s, it was moved to the Hall of African Wildlife where it was shown with traditional natural dioramas. In 2009, the museum made a snow globe depicting the group. Instead of the traditional snow, the museum had gold leaf pieces to make it look like the figures were in a sandstorm.

Second restoration

In 2016, Lion Attacking a Dromedary was restored by the museum for a second time. As part of the restoration, the museum conducted tests on the animals using X-rays and DNA analysis techniques of the taxidermied animals to determine if they were genuine. Verreaux was known to fake records to inflate the selling price of his dioramas. The human figure was determined to be mostly synthetic, but, to the surprise of the museum, the head contained a human skull. It is unknown to whom the skull belongs or from where Verreaux collected the skull. Previously, it was thought that the human figure was only made of plaster, but there was some speculation that there could be human remains in the diorama. When asked about the chances of there being human remains in the male figure in 2009, the museum denied it was a possibility stating that "European sensibilities would not have embraced an exhibit that used human parts, even in 1867".

In January 2017, the diorama went back on display in the foyer of the museum, after the museum rejected a proposal to move the diorama to the Carnegie Museum of Art and show it with other orientalist art. While the piece was moved, the name was changed from Arab Courier Attacked by Lions to Lion Attacking a Dromedary to better contextualize the piece. As a part of the unveiling, the Carnegie Museum of Natural History hosted a symposium about the restoration, the diorama, and its misrepresentation of North Africa.

Removal and recontextualization
In July 2020, the Carnegie Museum of Natural History removed Lion Attacking a Dromedary from view citing the Black Lives Matter movement and the lack of accuracy. Patrons were given a choice to view the diorama behind a curtain starting in September 2020. That remained the status quo until July 2021 when Lion Attacking a Dromedary was returned to public view with additional context. The decision to do so was made because, according to the museum's director "I think the curtains were more harmful than not having them up at all". The museum is considering moving the diorama to a part of the museum where it can be avoided.

Composition

Lion Attacking a Dromedary is a taxidermied diorama. It appears, to the viewer, as a frozen moment in time that could be reanimated momentarily. It depicts an imagined violent scene, a North African courier on a dromedary struggling for his life. The camel is bellowing in pain as a male Barbary lion is trying to climb up it to reach the courier who is attempting to stab the lion with his knife. The body of a female lion lies in front of the camel, dead from the courier's single shot; his long gun lies across the lioness. The male figure, referred to as an Arab by Verreaux, is a fictional pastiche of five North African cultures and is based on what Verreaux thought an Arab looked like.

Reception
Lion Attacking a Dromedary was created to celebrate the French colonial empire and uses orientalist tropes. The diorama is inaccurate both scientifically and anthropologically and is considered to be a work of fiction. Anthropologists, zoologists, and museum studies commentators have been critical of the piece since the 1890s. The Smithsonian Institution questioned the propriety of showing such a sensationalist diorama in 1892. Lion Attacking a Dromedary was removed from the American Museum of Natural History in 1898 and they considered destroying it because the museum felt that the diorama was "too emotional and distracting for educational purposes." Frederic Augustus Lucas defended Lion Attacking a Dromedary in 1914 from criticism of being overly theatrical by pointing out that by being theatrical the piece was interesting and drew the attention of museum patrons. By 2002, the diorama was seen as an example of "danger, excitement, and exoticism" of the other in orientalist works and was compared to a "sideshow attraction." Despite this, Lion Attacking a Dromedary is considered to be Verreaux's masterpiece by journalist Miquel Molina in an article in Pula: Botswana Journal of African Studies.

References

Notes

Citations

Bibliography
 
 
 
 

1867 sculptures
Carnegie Museum of Natural History
Dioramas
Orientalism
Monuments and memorials removed during the George Floyd protests
Individual taxidermy exhibits
Sculptures of lions